Nigeria competed in the Summer Olympic Games for the first time at the 1952 Summer Olympics in Helsinki, Finland.

Results by event

Athletics
Men's 100M
Edward Ajado	 
 First Round —	11.25s	DNQ

Titus Erinle
 First Round —	 11.12	DNQ

Men's 200M
Edward Ajado	 	
 First Round —	22.92s	DNQ

Muslim Arogundade	
 First Round —	22.71	DNQ

Rafiu Oluwa
 First Round —	22.89	(Q)
 Quarterfinals — 22.69	DNQ

Men's 4x100 relay
 First Round —	(Muslim Arongudade, Titus Erinle, Karim Olowu, Rafiu Oluwa)	42.4s (Q)
 Semifinals —		41.9	5th	DNQ

Long Jump
Karim Olowu
 First Round —	6.96	DNQ

Sylvanus Williams	 
 First Round —	6.98	DNQ
High Jump
Josiah Majekodunmi	 
 First Round —	1.87m	(Qualified)
 Final —	1.90m	9th

Nafiu Osagie	 
 First Round —	1.87m	(Qualified)
 Final —	1.90m	18th

Boniface Guobadia 
 First Round —	1.87m  (Qualified) 
 Final —	1.80m	20th

References
Official Olympic Reports

1952
Summer Olympics
1952 Summer Olympics
Nations at the 1952 Summer Olympics